This page lists all described species of the spider family Hypochilidae as of Jan. 6, 2017.

Ectatosticta
Ectatosticta Simon, 1892
 Ectatosticta davidi (Simon, 1889) (type species) — China
 Ectatosticta deltshevi Platnick & Jäger, 2009 — China

Hypochilus
Hypochilus Marx, 1888
 Hypochilus bernardino Catley, 1994 — USA
 Hypochilus bonneti Gertsch, 1964 — USA
 Hypochilus coylei Platnick, 1987 — USA
 Hypochilus gertschi Hoffman, 1963 — USA
 Hypochilus jemez Catley, 1994 — USA
 Hypochilus kastoni Platnick, 1987 — USA
 Hypochilus petrunkevitchi Gertsch, 1958 — USA
 Hypochilus pococki Platnick, 1987 — USA
 Hypochilus sheari Platnick, 1987 — USA
 Hypochilus thorelli Marx, 1888 (type species) — USA

References
  (2014): The world spider catalog, version 17.5. American Museum of Natural History. 

Hypochilidae